Douglas Cody Clark (born September 14, 1981) is an American professional baseball catcher. He played for the Houston Astros of Major League Baseball during the 2013 season. He is currently an advanced scout for the Kansas City Royals.

Playing career
Clark attended Fayetteville High School in Fayetteville, Arkansas.  The Toronto Blue Jays selected Clark in the 48th round of the 2000 Major League Baseball (MLB) Draft, but Clark did not sign. He enrolled at the University of Arkansas and played college baseball for the Arkansas Razorbacks baseball team in 2002 before transferring Wichita State University to play for the Wichita State Shockers baseball team.

Texas Rangers
The Texas Rangers drafted Clark in the 11th round of the 2003 MLB Draft, and he signed.

Atlanta Braves
Clark played in minor league baseball for the Rangers, then Atlanta Braves, and in independent baseball.

Kansas City Royals
He signed with the Kansas City Royals organization in 2007. After a disappointing 2008 season in Class AA of the minor leagues, Clark considered retirement. He again considered retiring after the 2012 season.

Houston Astros
Clark signed with the Houston Astros organization before the 2013 season. The Astros promoted Clark to the major leagues for the first time on August 23, 2013, when they placed Max Stassi on the disabled list. On September 13, 2013, in a game against the Los Angeles Angels, Clark got his first hit in the Major Leagues off of starter Jason Vargas. He was outrighted off the Astros roster on October 2, 2013.

Coaching career
Clark retired after the 2013 season, and joined the Kansas City Royals as their instant replay coordinator for the 2014 season. During the season, he became the Royals' bullpen catcher.  After the 2016 season, he was reassigned to a scout.

Personal
Clark's father, Doug, played minor league baseball for the Oakland Athletics' organization. His wife, Jordan, was pregnant with their first child when he was first promoted to the majors.

References

External links

1981 births
Living people
Sportspeople from Fayetteville, Arkansas
Baseball players from Arkansas
Baseball catchers
Houston Astros players
Arkansas Razorbacks baseball players
Wichita State Shockers baseball players
Spokane Indians players
Clinton LumberKings players
San Diego Surf Dawgs players
Rome Braves players
Wilmington Blue Rocks players
Omaha Royals players
Northwest Arkansas Naturals players
Omaha Storm Chasers players
Brisbane Bandits players
Oklahoma City RedHawks players
Corpus Christi Hooks players
Kansas City Royals coaches
Kansas City Royals scouts
Major League Baseball bullpen catchers
American expatriate baseball players in Australia